Zhang Chunqiao (1 February 1917 – 21 April 2005) was a prominent Chinese political theorist, writer, and politician. He came to the national spotlight during the late stages of the Cultural Revolution, and was a member of the ultra-Maoist group dubbed the "Gang of Four".

Biography
Born in Juye County, Shandong, Zhang worked as a writer in Shanghai in the 1930s and became closely associated with the city. After the Yan'an conference in 1938, he joined the Communist Party of China. With the creation of the People's Republic of China, he became a prominent journalist in Shanghai in charge of the Liberation Daily newspaper. He met Jiang Qing in Shanghai and helped to launch the Cultural Revolution.

Zhang first came to prominence as the result of his October 1958 Jiefang ("Liberation") magazine entitled “Destroy the Ideology of Bourgeois Right.” Mao Zedong ordered the reproduction of the article in People’s Daily, and personally wrote an accompanying “Editor’s Note” giving the article his own mild approval. He was seen as one of Mao Zedong's full supporters as Mao became involved in an ideological struggle with rival leader Liu Shaoqi.

In November 1966, at the outset of the Cultural Revolution, Zhang arrived in Shanghai representing the Central Cultural Revolution Group to stop Cao Diqiu's attempt to disperse workers in Anting. He signed the Five-point Petition of workers and then organized the Shanghai Commune along with Wang Hongwen and Yao Wenyuan in February 1967, essentially overthrowing the local government and party organization and becoming chairman of the city's Revolutionary Committee, which combined both the former posts of mayor and party secretary, until the latter post was restored in 1971. Zhang also initially served as one of the leaders of the Cultural Revolution Group, in charge of carrying out the Cultural Revolution around China. He spent much of the Cultural Revolution shuttling between Beijing and Shanghai. 

In April 1969 he joined the Politburo of the Communist Party of China and in 1973 he was promoted to the Politburo Standing Committee, a council of top Communist leaders. In January 1975 Zhang became the second-ranked Vice Premier and he wrote "On Exercising All-Round Dictatorship Over the Bourgeoisie" to promote the movement of studying the theory of the dictatorship of the proletariat; Deng Xiaoping was the first-ranked Vice Premier at the time, but Deng was out of office again in 1976. 

He was arrested along with the other members of the Gang of Four in October 1976, as part of a conspiracy by Ye Jianying, Li Xiannian and newly anointed party leader Hua Guofeng. Zhang was sentenced to death with a two-year reprieve, together with Jiang Qing, in 1984, but his sentence was later commuted to life imprisonment, and in December 1997 the sentence was further reduced to 18 years.

In 1998, Zhang was released from prison to undergo medical treatment. He then lived in obscurity in Shanghai for the remainder of his life. Zhang died from pancreatic cancer in April 2005.

Notes

References 
Zhang Chunqiao Reference Archive
"On Exercising All-Round Dictatorship over the Bourgeoisie"

|-

|-

|-

|-

1917 births
2005 deaths
Politicians from Heze
Anti-revisionists
Maoist theorists
People of the Cultural Revolution
Mayors of Shanghai
Deaths from cancer in the People's Republic of China
Chinese Communist Party politicians from Shandong
Gang of Four
People's Republic of China politicians from Shandong
Chinese politicians convicted of crimes
Members of the 10th Politburo Standing Committee of the Chinese Communist Party
Members of the 9th Politburo of the Chinese Communist Party
Deaths from pancreatic cancer
Chinese Marxists
Chinese Maoists
Secretaries of the Communist Party Shanghai Committee